The 2020 FC Astana season is the twelfth successive season that Astana will play in the Kazakhstan Premier League, the highest tier of association football in Kazakhstan. Astana are defending Kazakhstan Premier League holders, having won their sixth title the previous season. Astana will also play in the season opening Super Cup against FC Kaisar, the Kazakhstan Cup and enter the Champions League at the First qualifying round.

Season events
On 13 January, Roman Hryhorchuk left Astana by mutual consent. The following day, 14 January, Michal Bílek was announced as the new Head Coach of Astana.
On 24 January, Astana announced the signing of Max Ebong on a four-year contract from Shakhtyor Soligorsk, and Tigran Barseghyan to a two your contract from Kaisar.

On 17 February, Rangelo Janga moved to Lugano on loan until 30 June.

On 20 February, Astana announced the signing of Pieros Sotiriou to a three-year contract from Copenhagen.

Due to on going repair work at the Astana Arena, Astana started the season by playing their home games at the Zhas Kyran Stadium in Almaty.

On 13 March, the Football Federation of Kazakhstan announced all league fixtures would be played behind closed doors for the foreseeable future due to the COVID-19 pandemic. On 16 March the Football Federation of Kazakhstan suspended all football until 15 April.

On 30 May, the Professional Football League of Kazakhstan announced that Irtysh Pavlodar had withdrawn from the league due to financial issues, with all their matches being excluded from the league results.

On 26 June, it was announced that the 2020 Kazakhstan Premier League would resume on 1 July.

On 2 July, Serhiy Malyi left Astana after his contract expired.

On 3 July, the Kazakhstan Premier League was suspended for two-weeks due to the COVID-19 pandemic.

On 23 July, Sultan Sagnayev and Ramazan Karimov had their season-long loan deals with Caspiy ended prematurely and they returned to the club.

On 7 August, Sparta Prague announced that defender Uroš Radaković had joined Astana on loan for the remainder of the 2020 season, with Astana holding an option to make the transfer permanent. On 8 August, Astana confirmed the arrival of Radaković.

On 22 August, Rangelo Janga was loaned to NEC Nijmegen for one-year.

On 26 August, Michal Bílek was sacked as manager, with Executive Director Paul Ashworth being placed in temporary charge. Ashworth his role as caretaker manager and executive director by mutual consent on 7 October. On 16 October, former captain Andrey Tikhonov was appointed as the clubs new manager.

Squad

On loan

Transfers

In

Loans in

Out

Loans out

Released

Friendlies

Competitions

Super Cup

Premier League

Results summary

Results by round

Results

League table

Kazakhstan Cup

UEFA Champions League

Qualifying rounds

UEFA Europa League

Qualifying rounds

Squad statistics

Appearances and goals

|-
|colspan="16"|Players away from Astana on loan:
|-
|colspan="16"|Players who left Astana during the season:

|}

Goal scorers

Clean sheets

Disciplinary record

References

External links
Official Website 
Official VK

FC Astana seasons
Astana
Astana
Astana